Pavel Grigorievich Egorov (8 January 1948 – 15 August 2017) was a Russian pianist and scholar.

He won the VI Robert Schumann Competition before graduating in 1975 from the Moscow Conservatory. He has performed widely at an international level since (ca. 3000 performances). He was a professor and the Head of the Piano Department at the Saint Petersburg Conservatory, where he taught from 1980 until his death.

Pavel Egorov was named a Meritorious Artist of the Russian Federation, and was a member of Saint Petersburg branch of the Russian Academy of Natural Sciences, and an Honorary Member at the Robert Schumann Society in Düsseldorf and the Saint Petersburg Philharmonic Society. The scientific editor of the first Russian edition of Robert Schumann's complete piano works (Muzyka, 1986), he was awarded the Robert Schumann Prize of the City of Zwickau in 1989.

He died of cancer  on 15 August 2017 at the age of 69.

References

External links
 Nikolay Rimsky-Korsakov Saint Petersburg State Conservatory
 Personalities of Saint Petersburg

1948 births
2017 deaths
Soviet classical pianists
Russian classical pianists
Male classical pianists
Academic staff of Saint Petersburg Conservatory
People's Artists of Russia
Moscow Conservatory alumni
Soviet music educators
Russian music educators
Musicians from Saint Petersburg